The BC Forest Discovery Centre, located in Duncan, chronicles the history of logging in British Columbia, Canada.

History
G.E. (Gerry) Wellburn, a collector, was the founder of the Centre which opened in 1965 as the Cowichan Valley Forest Museum. It was later known for a time as the BC Forest Museum.

Collection
There are indoor and outdoor exhibits spread over a  site, including operating steam and gas rail equipment plus logging trucks. There are forest and nature trails, picnic area, playground, gift shop and a concession.  At the Centre visitors can explore a reconstructed logging camp, forest fire lookout tower and the ranger's station.

The centre has its own heritage railway, a train pulled by a century-old steam locomotive which was once used in the filling in of the North Vancouver harbour.  Along the route is one of the first pre-fabricated school houses, a trestle over Somenos Lake and an operational water wheel.

The Forest Discovery Centre has seven steam locomotives in its collection:
 Mayo Lumber Company #3 Shay (class B) (was on loan to Kettle Valley Steam Railway 1995–2009)
 Hillcrest Lumber Company #1 Shay (class B) ( gauge)
 Bloedel Stewart and Welch  Shay (class B) #1 (})
 Shawnigan Lake Lumber #2 Climax (class B) ( standard gauge)
 Hillcrest Lumber Company #9 Climax (class B) ( standard gauge) - the only operational Climax locomotive in Canada)
 Cowichan Valley Railway #24 Vulcan 0-4-0T "Suzie" ( gauge)
 Cowichan Valley Railway #25 Vulcan 0-4-0T "Samson" ( gauge)
In addition, these diesel locomotives are also part of the collection:
 Cowichan Valley Railway #23 "Sandy" Plymouth  
 Cowichan Valley Railway #27 "Handy Andy" speeder
 British Columbia Forest Products #9 Whitcomb Locomotive Works ( 0-4-4-0 diesel)

Site
The site has a reconstructed fire watch tower, which offers a commanding view of the site and nearby Somenos Marsh.

The Centre borders the Somenos Marsh Wildlife Refuge and Ducks Unlimited pond. Many types of water fowl and other birds can be found in this area. Red-Eared Slider turtles can be found sunning in the field next to the marsh.

Two bald eagles have built a nest in the stand of trees west of the North Cowichan Station at the centre's lower grounds. These eagles successfully raised eaglets in 2006 after relocating from a previous nest site along the South Forester's Walk the previous summer. There are currently three eaglets in their nest. The nest is best viewed by standing at the flag pole outside the Wellburn Building at the lower grounds.

See also

List of heritage railways in Canada
List of museums in Canada

References

External links
Centre's website
Centre's website on Cowichan Forestry Life
Vancouver Island attractions

Duncan, British Columbia
Heritage railways in British Columbia
Forestry museums in Canada
Museums in British Columbia
Open-air museums in Canada
Railway museums in British Columbia